The National Women's Soccer League Rookie of the Month is a monthly soccer award given to individual players in the National Women's Soccer League who are participating in their first season as a professional. Players are voted by the NWSL Media Association, a group of people who cover the league.

Winners

2022

See also 

 List of sports awards honoring women
 NWSL Player of the Week
 NWSL Player of the Month
 NWSL Team of the Month
 NWSL awards
 NWSL records and statistics
 Women's soccer in the United States

References

Rookie of the Month
Association football player of the month awards
Awards established in 2022
Rookie of the Month
Lists of women's association football players
Association football player non-biographical articles